Make Me Laugh was an American  television game show in which contestants watch three stand-up comedians performing their acts, one at a time, earning one dollar for every second that they could make it through without laughing. Each comedian had sixty seconds to try to make the contestant laugh for a maximum of $180.

The hosts
The original version, with Robert Q. Lewis as host, aired for three months in 1958 on ABC. Bobby Van hosted a syndicated revival during  1979–80, and Ken Ober hosted a 1997 revival on Comedy Central, replaced for the second season by Mark Cohen.

ABC version
Each episode featured four guests. Originally, the first three guests were civilians, while the fourth was a celebrity who played for a home viewer who was chosen by pulling a postcard from a revolving drum. This was later changed to having celebrities playing for home viewers throughout the whole show.

Syndicated version
On the syndicated  version of Make Me Laugh hosted by Bobby Van, contestants were selected from the audience, and those who lasted the full three minutes had their winnings doubled to $360; also, a celebrity guest would play the last round of each episode, playing for an audience member who would receive a prize just for being chosen and up to three more prizes based on how many comedians the celebrity could survive.
Van's version of Make Me Laugh was popular and initially drew good ratings, but they slowly dropped over the course of the run and production went on hiatus at the end of 1979. Van was also ill with brain cancer while the show was in production; the final episode was broadcast on February 25, 1980, and Van died the following July.

Van's version of the program is especially noteworthy for the early appearances of several then-unknown comedians before going on to greater fame; among them were Tom Hanks, Peter Scolari,   Garry Shandling, Bob Saget, Howie Mandel, Richard Belzer, Vic Dunlop, Mike Binder, Gallagher, Gary Mule Deer, Yakov Smirnoff, Tom Dreesen, Kip Addotta, Bruce 'Babyman' Baum, and Bill Kirchenbauer.
Celebrity contestants who appeared on the program included Frank Zappa, Dr. Joyce Brothers, Jaye P. Morgan, Tiny Tim, Phil Everly, Bert Convy, Ken Kercheval,  Anne Lockhart, and Demond Wilson.
The show was written by comedian Marty Cohen, Biff Manard, Howard Itzkowitz, and Michael Smollins, the first three of whom also appeared as comedians.

The theme music for the 1970s version was entitled Laugh, and was performed by Artie Butler and the Big Boffers.

Reruns of this version later aired on the USA Network from October 2, 1984 to September 26, 1986.

Comedy Central version
Like its syndicated predecessor, the Comedy Central version of Make Me Laugh also featured several fledgling comics who went on to successful careers, including Patton Oswalt, Frank Nicotero and Heath Hyche.

The game remained the same, but with new additions. There were two formats to this version:

Ober's version

Round One
Three contestants competed, one at a time; rules were the same as the original version.

Round Two (The Toughest Room in America)
Two audience members were chosen for this round, one at a time, each with one of the comedians performing for 60 seconds and trying to elicit a laugh. Contestants made two separate predictions for the outcomes and wagered a portion of their scores; a correct prediction added the amount of the contestant's wager to his/her score, while an incorrect prediction deducted it. The contestant with the highest score at the end of this round won the game and kept his/her winnings, while the other two received joke consolation prizes.

Bonus Round (Tag Team Round)
This round is called "The Tag Team Round", because the winning contestant now faced all three comics in this final round of the game. The contestant had the usual 60 seconds to face each one, and the comics alternated turns. If the winning contestant survived the full minute, he/she won $500, otherwise he/she earned $5 per second.

Cohen's version

Round One
Three contestants, who were randomly selected from the studio audience, competed; each one came out one by one in round one, much like the 1970s version.

Round Two (Tag Team Round)
One audience member was chosen for a 90-second performance by all three comedians, with each taking 30 seconds. The contestants wagered a portion of their scores on their predictions as to whether any of the comedians could make the audience member laugh;  a correct prediction added the amount of the wager, while an incorrect prediction deducted it. The highest scorer kept his/her winnings, while the others received real consolation prizes.

Bonus Round (Mystery Comic)
The winning contestant faced a "Mystery Comic", whose identity was not revealed until it came time for the round to be played. He/she earned $5 per second for not laughing, up to a maximum of $500 for 100 seconds (1 minute 40 seconds).

2016 proposal
A possible revival was considered for syndication as an entry during the fall 2016 season but was scrapped.

British version
A British version produced by Associated-Rediffusion hosted by Chesney Allen aired on ITV for one series in 1958. In 1983, Tyne Tees produced a revival hosted by Bernie Winters for ITV; this version was notable for having an early appearance by Brian Conley.

References

External links

1958 American television series debuts
1958 American television series endings
1979 American television series debuts
1980 American television series endings
1997 American television series debuts
1998 American television series endings
1950s American comedy game shows
1970s American comedy game shows
1980s American comedy game shows
1990s American comedy game shows
American Broadcasting Company original programming
Black-and-white American television shows
Comedy Central game shows
Panel games
Television series by CBS Studios
Television series by Disney–ABC Domestic Television
American television series revived after cancellation
1950s British game shows
1980s British game shows